|}

The Montrose Stakes is a Listed flat horse race in Great Britain open to fillies aged two years only.
It is run at Newmarket over a distance of 1 mile (1,609 metres), and it is scheduled to take place each year in late October or early November.

The race was first run in 1999.

Winners

See also
 Horse racing in Great Britain
 List of British flat horse races

References 
Racing Post: 

Flat races in Great Britain
Newmarket Racecourse
Flat horse races for two-year-old fillies
Recurring sporting events established in 1999
1999 establishments in England